This is a list of destinations served or previously served by Norwegian Air Shuttle and its integrated subsidiaries .

The list includes destinations collectively served by Norwegian Air Shuttle, its active integrated subsidiary Norwegian Air Sweden, as well as its defunct subsidiaries Norwegian Air Argentina, Norwegian Air International, Norwegian Air UK, and Norwegian Long Haul over the airline group's history. The list excludes airports only operated to by charter services.

It includes the destination's country (or applicable territory), city, airport name, with the airline's notable statuses marked if applicable, such as seasonality, as a base, as a future destination (with an accompanying launch date), or as a terminated destination.

Map

Destinations

References

Annotations 

Lists of airline destinations
Destinations